The Norwegian identity card, commonly referred to as the national identity card in Norway, is a non-compulsory biometric identity document issued since 30 November 2020. It is one of two official identity documents issued by the Norwegian Police Service, the other being the Norwegian passport. It is only issued to Norwegian citizens, and may indicate citizenship so that it can be used as a travel document facilitating freedom of movement within the European Free Trade Association and the European Economic Area. For travel within the Nordic countries no identity documentation is legally required for Nordic citizens due to the Nordic Passport Union.

History

Earlier ID cards
During the Second World War, the authorities issued a mandatory identity card. This card was abandoned after the end of the war, as it was strongly associated with the occupation force and its control regime.

Norway Post started issuing a photo identity card on 1 March 1957, initially free for all residents over 15 years old. These were intended for use at the post offices, but were quickly adopted by other public and private instances as a valid photo ID. For several decades these were along with passports and driver's licenses the only widely recognized ID in Norwegian society. During the 1970s the postal ID cards were the only valid IDs for proving age on public transport.

Bank cards were launched in 1977, originally only serving as an ID card. These were intended for a clerk to be able to verify the identity of the person writing the check. By the 1980s the cards were used as debit cards, and even after checks were phased out of common use in the early 1990s, the bank cards retained a photo ID, including the national identity number of the person. The widespread use of bank cards as ID gradually led to the termination of postal ID cards. Legally, bank cards are a customer card which serves no particular legal purpose. However, because of the stringent requirements needed to verify one's identity to the bank in order to open an account and be issued a bank card, bank cards became widely accepted as ID cards, even at public institutions.

The banking sector was strongly in favor of replacing bank card-based IDs with government-issued IDs. Banks had no obligation to issue IDs. One issue was that the banks bore the cost of issuing the IDs. The other was that the banks did not have the same ability to authenticate people with confidence as government authorities, increasing the risk of fake IDs being issued. With the announcement of the National ID Card plans, a number of banks stopped issuing ID fields on their bank cards.

Need for a new ID card system
By the mid-2000s the situation had become untenable, with no generic, government-issued ID card available. Postal ID cards were phased out, banks were wanting to rid themselves of their obligation, passports could only be issued to Norwegian citizens and driver's licenses were restricted to those with the right to drive motor vehicles. Some people were left using their passports as their only valid ID. Certain group of immigrants were not able to acquire IDs altogether. Non-Norwegian citizens could not be issued passports, and without a government-issued ID card which showed their national identity number, they were unable to open a bank account. This further hindered them from getting jobs, as Norwegian anti-money laundering laws require wages to be paid to a bank account. The situation was not aided by Norway at the time not allowing multiple citizenship, which discouraged many foreigners who were long-term residents to apply for Norwegian citizenship.

Another issue was the lack of a government-issued eID. Banking, most private and eGovernment services relied heavily on private eID services, the most common being the bank-issued BankID. NorSIS stated that this was problematic because the government had no way of directly issuing eID with sufficiently high security levels. This largely effected the same people as were not able to open bank accounts, since holding a valid bank account had become the de facto means of acquiring an eID. NorSIS was also concerned that the quality of authentication issued by banks was inferior to that carried out by the police, which could lead to more fake IDs. Additionally, it was possible for a impostor to receive an eID for another person, without the victim having knowledge of the eID being issued. NorSIS recommended that all residents and other people in the National Population Register be issued a root eID from the government, as part of an ID card, and that other eID use these root eIDs as the basis for their verification.

Development and introduction

Norway decided in 2007 to introduce a voluntary national identity card, to be usable for travel to EEA countries. They were since delayed until introduced on 30 November 2020. The reason for the delay was that the responsible authorities required absolute security on both the cards and the validation of the identity at issuance, issuing new security requirements repeatedly.

The entire implementation cost, including development and upgrades to the passport offices, for the combined ID card and passport project, had reached 596 million Norwegian krone by 2018. 120 million of this was the cost of rebuilding the passport offices.

The Ministry of Justice and Public Security will send out a hearing, about making it possible for all people that have a national identity number, to get a national identity card. The card will not state nationality and therefore it cannot be used for travel. Until then, resident non-Norwegian citizens are not able to get ID cards, and for such people without a driver's license many still have no way of getting and ID card with their personal identity number.

From , the European identity card is intended to replace and standardise the various identity card styles currently in use in the EU/EEA. It will not mean so much change for the Norwegian identity card, as most required features, like a chip, is already there. A significant change is that the chip shall contain information about fingerprints. This means fingerprints must be read at application if not already stored by the authority, but this is already done when applying for passport.

With the introduction of the National ID Card, a number of major banks announced that they would be discontinuing the ID section on bank cards. Some stated that bank card ID would be an opt-in for their customers, while others stopped offering IDs entirely. An all-out retirement of bank card IDs may happen at a future date, once the National ID Cards have been fully implemented.

Issue 
ID cards are issued by the Norwegian Police Service. The issuing of ID cards uses the same framework as for issuing Norwegian passports and the two can be issued as part of the same transaction. There are 77 police stations equipped to issue passports and ID cards, and many smaller police stations no longer issue passports. This has been enacted to improve the quality of authenticating people and reducing the chance of false documentation being issued, in part due to a 2015 report from the Office of the Auditor General that showed lack of security measures related to issuing passports.

Travel document 
As a member of EFTA, Norwegian citizens have freedom of movement to live and work in other EFTA countries in accordance with the EFTA convention. Moreover, by virtue of Norway's membership of the European Economic Area, Norwegian citizens also have freedom of movement to live and work across all EEA member states.

As an alternative to presenting a passport, Norwegian citizens are entitled to use a valid national identity card to exercise their right of free movement in EFTA and the European Economic Area. Strictly speaking, it is not necessary for an EEA or Swiss citizen to possess a valid national identity card or passport to enter the EEA and Switzerland. In theory, if an EEA or Swiss citizen can prove their nationality by any other means (e.g. by presenting an expired national identity card or passport, or a citizenship certificate), they must be permitted to enter the EEA and Switzerland. An EEA or Swiss citizen who is unable to demonstrate their nationality satisfactorily must, nonetheless, be given 'every reasonable opportunity' to obtain the necessary documents or to have them delivered within a reasonable period of time.

Furthermore, the card can be used as a travel document to European Microstates, Balkan countries, French Overseas Territories, Montserrat (for max. 14 days) and organized tours to Tunisia. Until 30 September 2021, the United Kingdom accepted the card as well. Since then, the UK and the Crown Dependencies only allows EU/EEA and Swiss citizens fulfilling specific requirements to use national identity cards, until at least 31 December 2025.

For travel within the Nordic countries no identity documentation is legally required for Nordic citizens due to the Nordic Passport Union.

Characteristics 
Two variants of the ID card exists. National ID cards with travel rights can be used as identification and as a travel document within the EEA and Switzerland. National ID cards without travel rights are only valid for identification purposes.

 The version valid as a travel document has red text and a document number starting with GD from 29 July 2021, the previous version started with GC. The machine readable zone, printed on the reverse-side of the card starts with CA. 
 The version not valid as a travel document has green text and a document number starting with JGD since 29 July 2021, the previous version started with JG only. The machine readable zone, printed on the reverse-side of the card starts with XA. It is also denoted as "Not Valid as a Travel Document" in the place of the holder's nationality.

The identity cards are 85 × 54 millimetres in size. In the top left, the name Norway is written in the two forms of Norwegian; Bokmål and Nynorsk and Northern Sami "  " and below that, in smaller letters in English "NORWAY", and in the top right part of the card the words " " is placed above the English word "IDENTITY CARD" (in smaller letters). On the card valid for travel, the two-letter country code "NO" inside a red rectangle has been added to the left of the country name. The biometric passport symbol is placed in the middle.

Printed data 
The descriptions of the fields are printed in Bokmål, Nynorsk, Northern Sami and English.

 Surname 
 Given names 
 Sex
 Date of birth 
 Height
 Document number 
 Date of expiry 
 Nationality (only on card with travel rights, on the green version without travel rights the words "Not Valid as a Travel Document" is printed instead)
 Signature
 CAN

Chip 
The chip is compatible with ICAO 9303, 7th edition. All mandatory data groups according to ICOAO 9303 have information. The information can be retrieved from the CAN number on the front side or the MRZ zone on the reverse-side. The photo of the card holder is in colour, size 446x580px and coded in JPEG 2000.

On the new version issued since 29 July 2021, the following optional fields are in use:

Data group 11:
 01: The card holders full name has been coded as Surname<<Firstname<Middlename. Norwegian letters (ÆØÅ) are used, corresponding to the information in the Norwegian population register (Folkeregisteret).
 03: Norwegian national identification number

Data group 12:
 02: Date of issue (YYYYMMDD)
 04: Only in cards not valid for travel "Not valid for travel"
 08: Time of production (YYYYMMDDHHMMSS)
 09: Identificator

On cards issued until 29 July 2021, the following optional fields are in use:

Data group 11:

 01: The card holders full name has been coded as Surname<<Firstname<Middlename. Norwegian letters (ÆØÅ) are used, corresponding to the information in the Norwegian population register (Folkeregisteret). 
 03: Norwegian national identification number
 04:  Date of birth (YYMMDD)

Data group 12:
 04: Only in cards not valid for travel "Not valid for travel"
 08: Time of production (YYYMMDDHHMMSS)
 09: Identificator

See also
 National identity cards in the European Economic Area
 European identity card
Norwegian nationality law
Visa requirements for Norwegian citizens
Norwegian passport

Notes

References

External links
About Passport and ID Card on Norwegian Police Service
Norwegian ID Card Info on PRADO
National ID Card Control Guide

Radio-frequency identification
Norway
Authentication methods
International travel documents
Identity documents